Ripa or RIPA may refer to:

Places
 Ripa (rione of Rome), a rione of the City of Rome, Italy
 Ripa, Nepal, a village and municipality

People
 Albert de Rippe (c. 1500–1551), Italian lutenist and composer, also known as Alberto da Ripa
 Cesare Ripa (c. 1560–c. 1622), Italian author
 Henrik Ripa (1968–2020), Swedish politician
 Kelly Ripa (born 1970), American actress and talk show host
 Francesco Ripa (footballer, born 1974), Italian footballer who plays for Santegidiese
 Francesco Ripa (footballer, born 1985), Italian footballer who plays for Arzanese
 Manuela Ripa, member of the European Parliament

Other uses
 Radioimmunoprecipitation assay buffer (RIPA buffer), a radioimmunoprecipitation assay buffer
 Regulation of Investigatory Powers Act 2000, a UK law governing interception of communications (information technology)
 Ristocetin-induced platelet aggregation, an assay for von Willebrand disease
  Royal Institute of Public Administration, a defunct UK-based organisation for the furtherance of better public administration
  Robotic Industrial Process Automation , is the use of robots and automation technology to improve the efficiency and effectiveness of industrial processes. This can include tasks such as material handling, assembly, inspection, and testing.